Terence Elliott Beddard (30 October 1901 – 21 August 1966) was a British fencer. He competed at the 1936 and 1948 Summer Olympics. In 1939, he won the épée title at the British Fencing Championships.

References

1901 births
1966 deaths
British male fencers
Olympic fencers of Great Britain
Fencers at the 1936 Summer Olympics
Fencers at the 1948 Summer Olympics